N-Secure is a 2010 American crime thriller film, directed by David M. Matthews. The film stars Essence Atkins, Denise Boutte and Lamman Rucker.

Cast
Cordell Moore ... David Alan Washington
Essence Atkins ... Robin Joyner
Denise Boutte ... Tina Simpson
Lamman Rucker ... Isaac Roberts
Rick Ravanello ... Joe Hooks
Tempestt Bledsoe ... Jill
Caryn Ward ... Kim
Elise Neal ... Leslie
Toni Trucks ... Denise
BernNadette Stanis ... Dr. Heather
Nephew Tommy ... Papa Ray

Box office
In its opening weekend, N-Secure made $1.17 million at 486 locations. The total gross for the film was $2,595,644

References

External links

2010 films
Films set in Memphis, Tennessee
2010s English-language films